Theo Avgerinos (born September 22, 1978, in New York City) is a feature film director who directed Fifty Pills, an independent film. The film featured Lou Taylor Pucci, Kristen Bell, John Hensley, Nora Zehetner, Michael Peña, Jane Lynch, Monica Keena, and Eddie Kaye Thomas.

References

External links
 

1978 births
Living people
Film directors from New York City
21st-century American people